Gertrude Fehr was a German photographer. She was born in Mainz on Tuesday 5 March 1895 and died in 1996 at the age of 101. She was one of the earliest professional female photographers.

Biography 
Gertrude Fehr came from a prominent German Jewish family. In 1918, after an apprenticeship in the Munich studio of Eduard Wasow, Fehr opened her own studio, employing six people. In 1933, she was forced to flee Germany due to the political climate at the time. She fled with her future Swiss husband Jules Fehr. They fled to Paris and in 1934 the two of them opened the Publiphot school. In the end of the 1930s she and her husband moved to Switzerland. Where they opened a photography school in Lausanne. She proposed color photography in 1950. She died in 1996.

See also
List of German women photographers

References 

1895 births
1996 deaths
20th-century German photographers
German women photographers
German Jews
Artists from Mainz
Photographers from Rhineland-Palatinate
Jewish emigrants from Nazi Germany to Switzerland
20th-century women photographers
German centenarians
Women centenarians
20th-century German women artists